Daniel Trevor Christian (born 4 May 1983) is a former Australian professional cricketer with Aboriginal ancestry. He is considered to be a Twenty20 cricket specialist and has played for franchises all over the globe. Christian is known as a powerful hitter and a useful medium pacer. CricInfo's Peter English described him as a "natural all-rounder". He is seen as a cricket role model for Australia's indigenous population.

Early life
Born in 1983, Christian grew up in the town of Narrandera in the Riverina region of New South Wales and is of British, Irish Catholic and Australian Indigenous Wiradjuri ancestry. He lived in Narrandera until he completed primary school and then he moved to Sydney to attend St Gregory's College, Campbelltown..

Cricket career

In 2003, Christian attended the Australian Cricket Academy.

Christian played List A cricket for New South Wales in 2006 and 2007. After he was not offered a new contract for the 2007–08 season, he moved to South Australia where he soon found himself playing first-class cricket for the state team.

In 2009, Christian captained an Indigenous Australian cricket team that toured England. Cricinfo noted that "With the bat Christian can be brutal, particularly when aiming at Adelaide's square boundaries, and he is one of those rare strikers whose eyes don't need a warm-up ball." He was brought into Australia's Twenty20 team "following a series of brutal, clever and consistent performances."

In February 2010, he made his Twenty20 International debut against the West Indies. The following month, he was selected as a member of Australia's squad for the 2010 ICC World Twenty20 tournament.

Christian played for Hampshire in their victorious 2010 Twenty20 Cup campaign.

Additionally, Christian was a part of the Deccan Charger’s team which competed annually in the DLF IPL - he was purchased for US$900,000.

On 2 March 2012, he took figures of 5/31 which included a hat-trick in an ODI match against Sri Lanka at the MCG. Despite his impressive figures, Australia were unable to win the match.

He was picked up by the Royal Challengers Bangalore for a sum of US$100,000, and joined them for their IPL-6 campaign.

In 2013, Christian signed for the English side Gloucestershire Gladiators to play in the 2013 Twenty20 Cup, although he did play a first-class game for Gloucestershire against Australia A. The following year he signed for Middlesex Panthers to play in the 2014 t20 Blast, a spell which included an innings against Kent of 129, which included ten sixes and to date is the highest score by a batsman in a T20 game at the St. Lawrence Ground.

In 2015, Christian signed for his 4th English County, Nottinghamshire in a spell that would bring both him and the club great success in the t20 Blast competition.

In February 2017, he was bought by Rising Pune Supergiants team for the 2017 Indian Premier League. In January 2018, he was bought by the Delhi Daredevils in the 2018 IPL auction.

During the summer of 2018, he scored his first T20 hundred for the Notts Outlaws against Northamptonshire posting a record score at the County Ground in the process.

In October 2018, he was named in Jozi Stars' squad for the first edition of the Mzansi Super League T20 tournament. In July 2019, he was selected to play for the Dublin Chiefs in the inaugural edition of the Euro T20 Slam cricket tournament. However, the following month the tournament was cancelled.

In September 2019, he was named in the squad for the Jozi Stars team for the 2019 Mzansi Super League tournament. Christian led the Notts Outlaws to victory in the 2020 T20 Blast competition with a man of the match performance.

In November 2020, he was picked by Karachi Kings for Pakistan Super League. He played first few matches and then withdrew from tournament in March 2021 due to pandemic outbreak.Before that he was part of Multan Sultans in 2019.

In February 2021, Christian was bought by the Royal Challengers Bangalore in the IPL auction ahead of the 2021 Indian Premier League.

On 8 August 2021, Christian scored 30 runs off an over bowled by left-arm spinner Shakib Al Hasan as part of a 15-ball 39 scored against Bangladesh, to become the first Australian to hit five sixes in a single over of a T20 international. Later the same month, Christian was named as one of three players as injury cover in Australia's squad for the 2021 ICC Men's T20 World Cup.

Books

In 2022 he wrote The All-rounder - The inside story of big time cricket with Gideon Haigh about his exploits in cricket during 2021 with RCB, Australia and in the Hundred.

References

External links

 
 

1983 births
Living people
Indigenous Australian cricketers
Wiradjuri people
Cricketers from Sydney
Australian cricketers
Australia One Day International cricketers
Australia Twenty20 International cricketers
One Day International hat-trick takers
Brisbane Heat cricketers
Deccan Chargers cricketers
Delhi Capitals cricketers
Gloucestershire cricketers
Hampshire cricketers
Hobart Hurricanes cricketers
Jozi Stars cricketers
Karachi Kings cricketers
Melbourne Renegades cricketers
Middlesex cricketers
Multan Sultans cricketers
New South Wales cricketers
Nottinghamshire cricketers
Rising Pune Supergiant cricketers
Royal Challengers Bangalore cricketers
South Australia cricketers
Sydney Sixers cricketers
Trinbago Knight Riders cricketers
Victoria cricketers